The St. Stephen's Protestant Episcopal Church is a historic church building at 110 Fleming Street in Harrington, Delaware. It is a single-story wood-frame structure, built in 1876 in the Carpenter Gothic style.

Original features from its construction include the stained glass window in the western facade, and the exterior board-and-batten siding  The building was built by Rev. J. Leighton McKim as a mission church, and remained his personal property until his death in 1918, when it was transferred to the Episcopal Diocese of Delaware. It is now owned by the Harrington Historical Society, who operate it as a local history museum.

The building was listed on the National Register of Historic Places in 2014.

See also
National Register of Historic Places listings in Kent County, Delaware

References

Episcopal church buildings in Delaware
Churches completed in 1876
19th-century Episcopal church buildings
Churches in Kent County, Delaware
Churches on the National Register of Historic Places in Delaware
Museums in Kent County, Delaware
History museums in Delaware
National Register of Historic Places in Kent County, Delaware
Former Episcopal church buildings in the United States